Senator Campbell may refer to:

Members of the Northern Irish Senate
Thomas Joseph Campbell (1871–1946), Northern Irish Senator from 1929 to 1934

Members of the United States Senate
Alexander Campbell (American politician) (1779–1857), U.S. Senator from Ohio from 1809 to 1813
Ben Nighthorse Campbell (born 1933), U.S. Senator from Colorado from 1993 to 2005
George W. Campbell (1769–1848), U.S. Senator from Tennessee from 1815 to 1818

United States state senate members
Archibald Campbell (Wisconsin politician), Wisconsin State Senate
Carroll A. Campbell Jr. (1940–2005), South Carolina State Senate
Charles Campbell (Hawaii politician) (1918–1986), Hawaii State Senate
David Campbell (Virginia politician) (1779–1859), Virginia State Senate
Donna Campbell (born 1954), Texas State Senate
Dwight Campbell (c. 1888–1964), South Dakota State Senate
Ed H. Campbell (1882–1969), Iowa State Senate
Foster Campbell (born 1947), Louisiana State Senate
Francis Campbell (politician) (1829–1897), Wisconsin State Senate
Frank T. Campbell (1836–1907), Ohio State Senate
Harvey Campbell (politician) (1792–1877), Connecticut State Senate
James R. Campbell (Illinois politician) (1853–1924), Illinois State Senate
John B. T. Campbell III (born 1955), California State Senate
John F. Campbell (politician) (born 1954), Vermont State Senate
John Campbell (1765–1828), Maryland State Senate
Joseph Campbell (politician) (fl. 1940s–1960s), Maine State Senate
Kathy Campbell (born 1946), Nebraska State Senate
Lewis D. Campbell (1811–1882), Ohio State Senate
Paul G. Campbell Jr. (born 1946), South Carolina State Senate
Peter J. Campbell (1857–1919), Maryland State Senate
Robert B. Campbell (died 1862), South Carolina State Senate
Samuel Campbell (New York state senator) (1809–1885), New York State Senate
Skip Campbell (1948–2018), Florida State Senate
Thomas F. Campbell (1897–1957), New York State Senate
Timothy J. Campbell (1840–1904), New York State Senate
Tom Campbell (California politician) (born 1952), California State Senate
Tom Campbell (North Dakota politician) (born 1959), North Dakota State Senate
Tunis Campbell (1812–1891), Georgia State Senate
William J. Campbell (Illinois politician) (1850–1896), Pennsylvania State Senate
William W. Campbell (New York state senator) (1870–1934), New York State Senate
William Campbell (California politician) (1935–2015), California State Senate